Viçosa is a municipality in the state of Rio Grande do Norte in the Northeast region of Brazil.< It is the smallest municipality in that state in terms of area.

See also
List of municipalities in Rio Grande do Norte

References

Municipalities in Rio Grande do Norte